Army of Islam ( Jaysh al-Islām), officially The Army of Islam Group in Jerusalem (Jama'at Jaysh al-Islam fi Bayt al-Maqdis), is a Salafi Jihadist militant organization in the Gaza Strip. It was founded by the Doghmush clan in 2006, and is based  in the Tzabra neighborhood in the center of the Gaza Strip. The group has been designated a terrorist organization by the United States and the UAE.

Activities
The group's first prominent action was its involvement in the 2006 Gaza cross-border raid during which Israeli soldier Gilad Shalit was kidnapped. It also kidnapped BBC reporter Alan Johnston in 2007. The group appears to draw inspiration from, or is linked to, al-Qaeda, and has conducted at least one bombing of a Palestinian civilian target (an empty school) and a number of other kidnappings. The group was originally closely related to Hamas, but its extremist stances eventually alienated both Hamas and Fatah. The group has also been known as The Organization of jihad in Palestine and is linked to Abu Qatada, the British-based Palestinian-Jordanian extremist Sheikh who they demanded be released in exchange for Johnston.

On 3 November 2010 senior Army of Islam leader Mohammad Namnam was killed in a targeted killing when the car he was driving in Gaza City was hit by a missile fired from an Israeli military helicopter. Israel killed Namnam after Egyptian authorities reportedly tipped-off Israel that Namnam was helping plan a future attack on multinational security forces in Sinai. Following the 3 November air strike, the Israeli Air Force killed two other members of the group. Mohammed and Islam Yassif were killed in an air strike, fired from an unmanned drone, on 17 November 2010. The attack, coordinated with Israeli security services, Shin Bet, came around dawn on a busy street in Gaza City, and cited the same security issues as that in the killing of Namnam.

In 2011, the group told the French security services that they had planned an attack on the Bataclan theatre because its owners were Jewish.

A limited number of fighters belonging to the group travelled to Syria from 2012 to fight in the Syrian Civil War; several of these volunteers were killed in combat. In 2016, the Army of Islam released a eulogy for the Islamic State's commander Abu Omar al-Shishani after he was killed in fighting in al-Shirqat, Iraq. Nevertheless, the group has not openly admitted any links to ISIL.

By 2018, the group faced increasing repression by Hamas which was unwilling to tolerate its extremist activities. In turn, the group considers Hamas an apostate organization, and has called upon Muslims to carry out lone wolf attacks against Israel.

Kidnapping of Alan Johnston

In 2007 the group kidnapped the BBC correspondent Alan Johnston. On 25 June 2007 a video was released by the group showing Johnston with an explosive belt around his waist, with a demand for the release of Muslim prisoners in British custody. The group, which also kidnapped ten members of Hamas, had claimed that they would have killed him if there had been an attempt to rescue him by force. On 4 July 2007, after Gaza authorities arrested several members of the group including its spokesman, Abu Muthana, and following threats of execution, Johnston was handed over to Hamas officials and released after 114 days in captivity.

Alexandria bombing
The group has been linked with the 2011 bombing of a Coptic church in Alexandria that resulted in 23 deaths. Egypt's Interior Minister said on 23 January that evidence proved that the group planned and executed the attack. The group quickly denied responsibility, while also reportedly expressing support for the bombing.

See also
Jund Ansar Allah
Jahafil Al-Tawhid Wal-Jihad fi Filastin
Army of the Islamic State

References

Jihadist groups in Egypt
Jihadist groups in Palestine
Gaza–Israel conflict
Organisations of the Egyptian Crisis (2011–2014)
Organizations designated as terrorist by the United States
Groups affiliated with al-Qaeda